This is a list of nature centers and environmental education centers in the state of Connecticut.

To use the sortable tables: click on the icons at the top of each column to sort that column in alphabetical order; click again for reverse alphabetical order.

Resources
 Connecticut Outdoor and Environmental Education Association

External links
 Map of Connecticut nature centers and environmental education centers

 
Nature centers
Connecticut